Grupo Continental may refer to
Arca Continental, a Mexican beverage manufacturer, which merged with Grupo Continental in 2011
Grupo Continental, a Honduras conglomeration of businesses, including Banco Continental